Hashiguchi (written: 橋口 lit. "bridge mouth") is a Japanese surname. Notable people with the surname include:

, Japanese artist
, Japanese photographer
, Japanese footballer
, Japanese film director
, Japanese manga artist

Japanese-language surnames